Albania is a town and municipality in Caquetá Department, Colombia.

External links
 Government of Caqueta: Albania

Municipalities of Caquetá Department